The Harding County Courthouse, located on Pine St. in Mosquero, is the county courthouse in Harding County, New Mexico. The courthouse was completed in 1922; while the building had existed previously as a school, it was extensively remodeled to become the county courthouse. It is considered the grandest public building ever built in the county, the smallest in the state by population. The two-story building has a Classical Revival design with modest decoration; its main features include an entrance framed by piers and a cornice, pilasters above the entrance, and an egg and dart entablature. The courthouse grounds make up one of the only two dedicated public spaces in the county, along with the public square in Roy.

The courthouse was added to the National Register of Historic Places on December 7, 1987. It is one of 14 New Mexico county courthouses that were reviewed for their historical significance in 1987.

See also

National Register of Historic Places listings in Harding County, New Mexico

References

External links
Harding County Courthouse (Mosquero, New Mexico) and sign only, Flickr pics and discussion

Courthouses on the National Register of Historic Places in New Mexico
Neoclassical architecture in New Mexico
Government buildings completed in 1922
Buildings and structures in Harding County, New Mexico
County courthouses in New Mexico
National Register of Historic Places in Harding County, New Mexico
1922 establishments in New Mexico